The second season of the Saint Seiya Omega anime series is produced by Toei Animation. It began broadcasting on TV Asahi in Japan on April 7, 2013. As with the rest of the series, the season follows the adventures of Pegasus Kōga and his friends, along with Athena's Saints, in their fight against the Goddess Pallas and her army of Pallasites, assisted by the brand new Steel Saint Subaru.

This season is directed by Tatsuya Nagamine and Kohei Kureta and written by Yoshimi Narita. Toshihiko Sahashi is the returning composer of the anime.

This season's first twenty-six episodes were collected in both a Blu-ray and a DVD box released on January 29, 2014. The following episodes are set to be released in two boxes to be released on July 25, 2014.

Episodes
{| class="wikitable" style="width:98%;"
|-
! style="background: #CCF" |No.
! style="background: #CCF" |Title
! style="background: #CCF" |Original Airdate

|}

References

Omega
2013 Japanese television seasons
2014 Japanese television seasons